Sandra Goldbach (born 15 April 1977 in Dresden) is a German rower.

References 
 
 

1977 births
Living people
German female rowers
Rowers from Dresden
Rowers at the 2004 Summer Olympics
Olympic rowers of Germany
World Rowing Championships medalists for Germany
21st-century German women
20th-century German women